Paul Palmieri (born August 25, 1970) is an American entrepreneur and business leader in the mobile telecommunications and digital advertising industries.  He was the chairman and chief executive officer of Millennial Media (NYSE:MM), a company he co-founded in 2006 with Chris Brandenburg, until his resignation in January 2014. He is currently a Venture Advisor with New Enterprise Associates.

Early life
Paul was born in New Britain, Connecticut, and grew up in the Oakhurst section of Ocean Township, Monmouth County, New Jersey. He attended Red Bank Catholic High School and then went to Mount St. Mary's University where he graduated with a B.A. in political science.

Career
Following his graduation, Palmieri spent fifteen years working as a business development and telecom executive at companies including Sprint and Verizon Wireless.  At Verizon, Paul ran data efforts and helped grow data revenue from $35MM a year into a multiple billion dollar business.  Paul devoted much of his time to helping establish the foundations of the mobile content ecosystem and the app economy. 
 
Paul co-founded Millennial Media in May 2006, and in his position as President and CEO, led the company as it grew into the leading independent mobile advertising platform.

In March 2012, Millennial Media became a publicly traded company and its common stock is now listed on the NYSE under the ticker symbol MM 
 
Paul is the global vice chairman of the Mobile Marketing Association (MMA)  and a member of the board of directors at the Interactive Advertising Bureau (IAB).

On January 27, 2014, Palmieri stepped down from his position as CEO at Millennial Media to take on a role as Venture Advisor at New Enterprise Associates.  He was succeeded by Michael Barrett, a former Yahoo! Chief Revenue Officer.

Awards
 In 2011 Paul was named the Executive of the Year in Media and Entertainment by the American Business Awards 
 In 2010 Paul was named Ernst and Young Entrepreneur of the Year in Maryland

References

1970 births
Living people
American chief executives
American technology company founders
Mount St. Mary's University alumni
People from New Britain, Connecticut
People from Ocean Township, Monmouth County, New Jersey
Red Bank Catholic High School alumni